Braj Kumar Nehru MBE, ICS (4 September 1909 – 31 October 2001) was an Indian diplomat and Ambassador of India to the United States (1961–1968). 

He was the son of Brijlal Nehru and Rameshwari Nehru and first cousin once removed of India's first prime minister Jawaharlal Nehru.

Personal life 
Braj Kumar Nehru was born in Allahabad, Uttar Pradesh, India and was son of Brijlal Nehru and Rameshwari Nehru. He was educated at the Allahabad University (India), the London School of Economics and at Oxford University. He was awarded the Doctor of Literature degree by the University of Punjab, for his distinguished services in various fields. His grandfather, Pandit Nandlal Nehru, was the elder brother of Pandit Motilal Nehru. He was the cousin to the erstwhile Prime Minister of India, Indira Gandhi (née Nehru). In 1935, Nehru married Magdolna Friedman (5 December 1908, Budapest, Austria-Hungary - 25 April 2017, Kasauli, Himachal Pradesh, India), a fellow student in the UK who was of an Hungarian Jewish background. The ill-treatment of the Jewish community in Europe prompted her father to change her name to Magdolna Forbath. Her nickname was Fori.  After marriage, she changed her name to Shobha Nehru. He had three sons named Ashok Nehru, Aditya Nehru and Anil Nehru.

Career

National 

He joined the Indian Civil Service in 1934 and rose to be governor of seven different states of India. From 1934 to 1937 he held various government positions in the province of Punjab. Nehru became the secretary of economic affairs in 1957. He was appointed Commissioner General for Economic Affairs (external financial relations) of India in 1958. He was Governor of Jammu and Kashmir (1981–84), Assam (1968–73), Gujarat (1984–86), Nagaland (1968–73), Meghalaya (1970–73), Manipur (1972–73) and Tripura (1972–73). He was transferred overnight as the Governor of Jammu & Kashmir to Gujarat after he refused to help Indira Gandhi in destabilising the Farooq Abdullah government.

International 

Nehru worked as executive director in the World Bank (1949) and was Economic Minister at the Indian Embassy in Washington (1954). He helped to create the Aid India Club in 1958, which was a consortium of donor nations that committed to donate $2 million for the development of India. He also served as a diplomat, as ambassador to several countries and was offered the post of secretary-general of the United Nations in 1951, but declined. Nehru was also the Indian High Commissioner in London from 1973 to 1977. Braj was chairman of the United Nations Investment committee for 14 years. He represented India in the 'Sterlings balances' negotiations with Britain at the post-Second World War reparations conference.

Writer 

Nehru wrote an autobiography titled Nice Guys Finish Second. Mr. Ramesh Kumar Saxena, who worked for him for 35 years, helped writing his biography.

Awards 
He was appointed an MBE in the 1945 New Year Honours. He was awarded the Padma Vibhushan in 1999.

The speech "Civil Service in Transition" delivered at the India International Center in New Delhi on 15 October 1999 describes the need and the role played by a strong civil service. It also details the causes for the prevalent corruption in India's political system and civil services.

Death 
Nehru died in Kasauli, Himachal Pradesh, India on 31 October 2001 at the age of 92. His body was cremated in Delhi & the memorial service was held amongst the chanting of mantras from the holy scriptures.

References 

1909 births
2001 deaths
Kashmiri people
Indian diplomats
Recipients of the Padma Vibhushan in civil service
Nehru–Gandhi family
Governors of Jammu and Kashmir
Governors of Assam
Governors of Gujarat
Governors of Manipur
Governors of Meghalaya
Governors of Nagaland
Governors of Tripura
Ambassadors of India to the United States
Indian Civil Service (British India) officers
Members of the Order of the British Empire
High Commissioners of India to the United Kingdom
People from Allahabad
Alumni of the London School of Economics
Alumni of Balliol College, Oxford